The 1980 American League Championship Series was a best-of-five playoff that featured the American League West champion Kansas City Royals against the American League East champion New York Yankees. This was the fourth matchup between the two teams in the past five seasons, and Kansas City got a measure of revenge by beating the Yankees in three straight to advance to their first ever World Series.

Summary

New York Yankees vs. Kansas City Royals

Game summaries

Game 1

The series opener saw the Yankees throw their ace, Ron Guidry, against the Royals' Larry Gura. In the top of the second, the Bronx Bombers jumped out to a 2–0 lead when Rick Cerone and Lou Piniella smacked back-to-back home runs. However, in the bottom of the inning, the Royals struck back. Amos Otis singled to center and stole second, and John Wathan walked. A wild pitch moved Otis to third and Wathan to second, and Frank White doubled both men home to tie the game.

The Royals moved ahead in the third, when George Brett walked and moved to third on a ground-rule double by Otis. A single by Willie Aikens plated both Brett and Otis, chasing Guidry from the game. Brett added a home run off Ron Davis in the seventh, and a Willie Wilson double off Tom Underwood in the eighth scored Darrell Porter and White to give Kansas City a 7–2 lead. The Yankees, meanwhile, could not score against Gura after the back-to-back home runs of the second inning, and the Royals' hurler went the distance as his team drew first blood in the series with a 7–2 victory.

Game 2

Game 2 proved to be much more exciting after the Royals blowout of Game 1. For this contest, the Yankees sent Rudy May to the hill to face the Royals' Dennis Leonard.

Kansas City opened the scoring in the bottom of the third, as Darrell Porter and Frank White reached base with consecutive singles. Willie Wilson followed with a triple to right to bring both runners in, and then scored himself on a double to center field by shortstop U L Washington. The Yankees came back with two in the fifth, with Graig Nettles hitting an inside-the-park home run and Willie Randolph lashing a double to right to score Bobby Brown.

The eighth inning, however, proved to be the most memorable inning of the game, with the Royals clinging to their 3–2 lead and the Yankees threatening. Willie Randolph singled, and with two outs Bob Watson ripped a liner to deep left field. Confident in Randolph's speed, Yankee third base coach Mike Ferraro decided to wave Randolph home. Left fielder Willie Wilson overthrew his cutoff man, Washington, but third baseman George Brett made a heads-up play by backing up Washington. He then whirled and threw Randolph out at the plate. Television cameras panned the stands where Yankees Owner George Steinbrenner and General Manager Gene Michael were sitting.  A furious Steinbrenner appeared to shout Ferraro's name as he turned to Michael. The Royals ended up winning that game by a 3–2 margin and Steinbrenner continued to fume over the play.

Game 3

With a 2–0 series lead, the Royals headed to Yankee Stadium for Game 3. The Royals led 1-0 on Frank White's fifth-inning homer until the bottom of the sixth inning when Oscar Gamble hit a ground ball up the middle with Reggie Jackson on second. Eventual ALCS MVP Frank White ranged far to his right to field the ball, and knowing he could not throw out Gamble at first, attempted an off balance throw to third to hopefully catch Jackson rounding the bag. However, the throw by White, a multiple Gold Glove winner, was too high and Royals third baseman George Brett could not catch it. Jackson scored on the play and Gamble was given third base after the ball rolled into the dugout. Gamble later scored on a single by Rick Cerone and the Yankees gained a  2–1 advantage.

Holding on to a 2–1 lead in the seventh inning, pitcher Tommy John gave up a two-out double to Willie Wilson. Yankee manager Dick Howser brought in hard-throwing Goose Gossage, who gave up a single to U L Washington, bringing up George Brett. Brett had wowed the majors during the year, flirting with a .400 batting average, holding an average above .400 as late as September 19 before finishing the year at .390.  
Brett blasted a Gossage fastball into the upper deck, a three-run home run which stunned the Yankee Stadium crowd. The Royals had a 4–2 lead with All-Star reliever Dan Quisenberry on the mound.

The Yankees mounted a major threat in the eighth, loading the bases with no one out. Quisenberry then got Rick Cerone to line into a double play and the next batter to ground out to close out the inning. The ninth went one-two-three as the Royals and the long-suffering Kansas City baseball fans finally won the American League Pennant, getting revenge on the team that had eliminated them for three straight years.

Composite box
1980 ALCS (3–0): Kansas City Royals over New York Yankees

Aftermath
Dick Howser was fired shortly after the conclusion of the 1980 ALCS. Ironically, Howser would go on to win the 1985 World Series as manager of Kansas City.

This would also be the last time the Yankees would be swept in a postseason series for 32 years.

Four men involved with the 1980 ALCS — Yankees manager Dick Howser, outfielder Bobby Murcer, and catcher Johnny Oates; and Royals pitcher Dan Quisenberry — subsequently died of brain cancer. (Tug McGraw and John Vukovich of the Philadelphia Phillies, who defeated the Royals in that year's World Series, also succumbed to the disease, as did Ken Brett, who pitched for Kansas City in the 1980–81 regular seasons.)

References

External links
1980 ALCS at Baseball Reference

American League Championship Series
American League Championship Series
Kansas City Royals postseason
New York Yankees postseason
American League Championship Series
20th century in Kansas City, Missouri
American League Championship Series
American League Championship Series
1980s in the Bronx